David Livschitz (born 12 May 1897, died 30 October 1973) was a Russia-born Israeli politician who served as a member of the Knesset for Mapam, the Faction independent of Ahdut HaAvoda and Mapai between 1951 and 1959.

Biography
Born in the Russian Empire,  Livschitz was a member of the Dror and HeHalutz youth movements in Poland. In 1925, he joined the World Union of Poale Zion and Socialist Zionists. Between 1927 and 1937 he was a leader of Poale Zion in France, and was also editor of the party's publications.

In 1938, he made aliyah to Mandatory Palestine, where he became secretary of Mapai in Tel Aviv. In 1944, he joined the party's B Faction, and in 1948 joined Mapam, having been a member of the Assembly of Representatives. He narrowly missed out on being elected to the first Knesset on the Mapam list in 1949, but entered the Knesset as a replacement for Yitzhak Tabenkin on 12 April 1951.

He retained his seat in the July 1951 elections, but on 20 January 1953, he and Hannah Lamdan broke away from the party to form the Faction independent of Ahdut HaAvoda (several other Mapam MKs had broken away to re-establish Ahdut HaAvoda). On 13 January 1954 Livschitz and Lamdan joined Mapai.

Livschitz was re-elected in 1955, but lost his seat in the 1959 elections. He died on 30 October 1973.

References

External links

1897 births
1973 deaths
Members of the Assembly of Representatives (Mandatory Palestine)
Members of the 1st Knesset (1949–1951)
Members of the 2nd Knesset (1951–1955)
Members of the 3rd Knesset (1955–1959)
Jewish socialists
Poale Zion politicians
Mapam politicians
Faction independent of Ahdut HaAvoda politicians
Mapai politicians
Polish expatriates in France
Polish emigrants to Mandatory Palestine